Mike Hall Jr. is an American football defensive tackle who currently plays for the Ohio State Buckeyes.

Early life and high school career
Hall grew up in Streetsboro, Ohio and attended Streetsboro High School. As a junior, he made 72 tackles with 17 tackles for loss and five sacks. Hall was rated a four-star recruit and committed to play college football at Ohio State over offers from Cincinnati, Maryland, and Penn State.

College career
Hall redshirted his true freshman season at Ohio State. He entered his redshirt freshman season as a starter on the Buckeyes' defensive line. Hall had four total tackles with two tackles for loss and one sack in Ohio State's 2022 season-opening win against Notre Dame.

References

External links
Ohio State Buckeyes bio

Living people
American football defensive tackles
Players of American football from Ohio
Ohio State Buckeyes football players
Year of birth missing (living people)